Tõstamaa Landscape Conservation Area is a nature park which is located in Pärnu County, Estonia.

The area of the nature park is 1288 ha.

The protected area was founded in 1976 to protect the islets Heinlaid and Kivilaid.

References

Nature reserves in Estonia
Geography of Pärnu County